Gilberto Zanoletti (born 2 January 1980) is an Italian footballer. He plays as a midfielder for A.C. Rezzato.

Biography
Zanoletti started his career at Lombard club Lumezzane.
In January 2004 he left for Serie B club Vicenza in co-ownership deal for €300,000. In June 2005 Lumezzane's half was sold to Vicenza outright for free and Vicenza swap the half with Verona for Marco Mancinelli. Half of the registration of the players were both tagged for €475,000. Zanoletti wore no.88 shirt in pre-season. On 31 August he returned to Vicenza in 2-year contract for free and Verona also bought half of Julien Rantier's contract for €270,000 as well as the return of Mancinelli also for free. The direct swaps made both clubs had a financial benefits but not in the field.
Zanoletti returned to Lumezzane in January 2006 as free agent but in January of next year he left for Cremonese.
In January 2008 he left for Sangiovannese.
In November 2008 he joined Pizzighettone.
In 2009–10 season he spent half-season in Bulgarian A PFG club Botev Plovdiv and another half for Verolese of Serie D.
In February 2011 he joined Torres of Eccellenza Sardinia.
In 2011–12 Serie D he played for Rudianese and Itala San Marco Gradisca.
In December 2012 he joined Aurora Travagliato of Eccellenza Lombardy.
In November 2013 he played for Vasto Marina  of Eccellenza Abruzzo while in December 2013 he moved to Sardinia to the team of Tortolì.
In September 2014 he signed for Royale Fiore Piacenza while in January 2015 he joined A.C. Rezzato of Eccellenza Lombardy.

Footnotes

References

External links
 Lega Serie B profile 

Italian footballers
F.C. Lumezzane V.G.Z. A.S.D. players
A.C. Rodengo Saiano players
L.R. Vicenza players
Hellas Verona F.C. players
U.S. Cremonese players
A.S.D. Sangiovannese 1927 players
A.S. Pizzighettone players
Botev Plovdiv players
Serie B players
First Professional Football League (Bulgaria) players
Italian expatriate footballers
Expatriate footballers in Bulgaria
Italian expatriate sportspeople in Bulgaria
Association football midfielders
Footballers from Brescia
1980 births
Living people